The Commonwealth Coast Conference men's basketball tournament is the annual conference basketball championship tournament for the NCAA Division III Commonwealth Coast Conference. The tournament has been held annually since 1985. It is a single-elimination tournament and seeding is based on regular season records.

As conference champion, the winner receives the CCC's automatic bid to the NCAA Men's Division III Basketball Championship.

Results

Finals champion only
Championship game results incomplete, 1985–2003

Full results

Championship records
Results incomplete for 1985–2003

 Suffolk have not yet reached the finals of the CCC tournament
 Schools highlighted in pink are former members of the CCC

References

NCAA Division III men's basketball conference tournaments
Basketball Tournament, Men's
Recurring sporting events established in 1985
1985 establishments in the United States